The following lists events that happened during 2014 in Sudan.

Incumbents
President: Omar al-Bashir
Vice President:
 Bakri Hassan Saleh (First)
 Hassabu Mohamed Abdalrahman (Second)

Events

May
 May 15 - An eight-month pregnant Christian woman, Meriam Yehya Ibrahim, is sentenced to death by hanging for apostasy in Sudan in a case that has drawn widespread international condemnation.

November
 November 27 - At least 133 people were killed and 100 wounded, in the aftermath of clashes between Awlad Omran and Al-Ziyoud groups of the Mesiria tribe. The clashes occurred in the Kwak area of the West Kurdufan state.

References

 
Sudan
Years of the 21st century in Sudan
2010s in Sudan
Sudan